This is a list of Congolese people.

Kevin Andzouana, footballer
Hilaire Babassana
Fidèle Dimou
 Junior Etou (born 1994), basketball player
Alphonse Gondzia
Serge Ibaka, basketball player
Ernest Kombo
Bill Kouélany
Jean-Pierre Lékoba
Alphonse Massemba-Débat
Justin Ballay Mégot
Émile Mokoko Wongolo
Jean-Marie Mokoko
Isidore Mvouba
Niasony
Marien Ngouabi
Denis Sassou Nguesso
Dominique Ntsiété
Émilienne Raoul
Sony Lab'ou Tansi
Patrice Yengo
Fulbert Youlou

See also
List of Republic of the Congo writers
List of people by nationality

References

 
Congo